Kerala State Chalachitra Academy is an autonomous non-profit institution working under the Department of Cultural Affairs, Government of Kerala. It was founded in August 1998 for the promotion of cinema in Kerala, considering that cinema is the most popular art form in Kerala. The academy was first of its kind in India and was formed on the basis of the Karant committee report (1980), which proposed the formation of a national film academy. Under the leadership of T K Ramakrishnan, The Minister for Cultural Affairs appointed Shaji N.Karun as its first chairman.

Objectives 
The objectives and functions of the Academy are:

To help Government in the formulation of policies connected with film and television related activities
To set up a film and video archive
To set up a Directorate of Film Festivals
To manage and distribute State Award for films and video programmes
To set up an Audio Visual Library for the public
To function as a link between the Government and film industry
To evolve a financial mechanism to support films having aesthetic and social importance
To extend promotional support to makers of good films and TV/Video programmes
To advise the Government to set up a Film and Television institute in the State and to start a State Television channel
To plan and execute specific films and television activities with the co-operation of KSFDC and C-DIT
To promote children's films and to create sufficient arrangements to exhibit them in schools and other cultural centres
To set up a documentation cell to document the history of Malayalam Cinema and profile of film personalities
To organise film appreciation and study camps in different places
To set up an Academic Library and provide research facilities to public and students
To publish books, journals, etc. on cinema and television
To support film societies by providing grants and other facilities
To hold meetings, seminars conferences, lectures, symposia and discussion on cinema, television and other arts
To honour eminent personalities in cinema and television from the State and the country
To distribute subsidy to Malayalam films and to carry out such directions as may be given by the Government from time to time

Activities
 Honouring achievements in Malayalam films: Tha academy organises the Kerala State Film Awards from 1999. The award, which was started in 1963 was managed directly by the Department of Cultural Affairs, Government of Kerala.
 Film Festivals: The academy hosts the International Film Festival of Kerala (IFFK), a prestigious film festival in India. The best films in the festival are honoured with the Crow Pheasant Awards.
 Bestowing fellowships on various personalities in the field of cinema.
 Promotion of film societies.
 Publication of books and periodicals on cinema.
 Conducting film appreciation courses.
 Organising seminars and workshops for students and professionals.

Kerala State Film Awards 

The Academy organises the Kerala State Film Awards, which are given away yearly for the achievements in Malayalam films. The awardees are decided by an independent jury formed by the academy and the Department of Cultural Affairs, Govt. of Kerala. The jury usually consists of eminent personalities from the film field. For the awards for literature on cinema a separate jury is formed. The academy annually invites films for the award and the jury analyses the films that are submitted before deciding the winners. The awards intends to promote films with artistic values and encourage artistes and technicians. The awards are declared by the Minister for Cultural Affairs, Govt. of Kerala.

Kerala State Television Awards 
The emergence of Television as a popular medium found acceptance at the Academy as separate awards were constituted for Television programmes also. The Academy organises the Kerala State Television Awards since 1993, which are given away yearly for the achievements in Malayalam Television. The awards are declared by the Minister for Cultural Affairs, Govt. of Kerala.

IFFK 

The IFFK (International Film Festival of Kerala) is one of the prominent film festivals hosted in India, and it is managed by the academy. The festival gives weightage to films from the Third World. It only allows films from Asia, Africa and Latin America in its competition section. The festival is always noted for its public support. The festival is perhaps the only one to have screenings for residents of a jail, a juvenile home (Poojappura Central Jail, Thiruvananthapuram) and a poor home (Sri Chitra Poor Home).

IDSFFK
The IDSFFK (International Documentary and Short Film Festival of Kerala) is an annual documentary and short film festival conducted by Kerala State Chalachitra Academy, at the state capital Thiruvananthapuram.

See also
 Cinema of Kerala
 Kerala State Film Development Corporation

References

Film organisations in India
Organizations established in 1998
Malayalam cinema
Organisations based in Thiruvananthapuram
Culture of Thiruvananthapuram
Mass media in Thiruvananthapuram
1998 establishments in Kerala